Kristjan Kõrver (born 1 October 1976, in Tallinn) is an Estonian composer.

In 2003, he graduated from Estonian Academy of Music and Theatre in composition speciality.

Since 2003, he is a member of Estonian Composers' Union.

Awards:
 2013 Annual Award of the Endowment for Music of Cultural Endowment of Estonia

Works

 "Symphonism 12" (work for symphony orchestra: 2009)
 chamber opera "The Iron-Ants" ('Raud-Ants'; 2013) 
 "Schizzo concertato" (work for string orchestra; 2016)

References

Living people
1976 births
Estonian composers